Diexi may refer to:

Diexi, Mao County, town in Mao County, Sichuan, China
Diexi Lake, lake in Mao County, Sichuan, China